20 Fingers is the self-titled second and final studio album of American music group 20 Fingers. It has been released on October 24, 1995, under Zoo Entertainment/SOS Records, six months after the release of their debut album On the Attack and More.

Background
In 1995, the group released their self-titled second studio album, called "20 Fingers" worldwide. The album has unlike the first studio album, where only two vocalists, Gillette on eleven tracks and Roula on one track, the peculiarity of featuring different vocalists for almost every song. In France, the album was released under the name L'album with an altered cover art and track list. Their first single, fifth overall, "Sex Machine" featuring Katrina (Roxanne Dawn) was released in 1995, which was another club hit but did not sell as well as its predecessors. It was the only single released of this album credited as "20 Fingers featuring Katrina", while further single releases were only credited under the name of the featured vocalist, such as Nerada's "Position #9", Dania's "She Won't Know", Rochelle's "Praying for an Angel" and "Holding on to Love" or A' Lisa B's "I'm in Love" with the addition "A 20 Fingers Production". Next to all new original material, some versions of this album also consist of three previously released 20 Fingers singles "Short Dick Man" and "Lick It", the remix of "Mr. Personality" called "Ugly" and the two previously released Max-A-Million singles "Take Your Time" and "Fat Boy" produced by 20 Fingers. In Fact that all previous 20 Fingers singles, in original or remixed form, are included on these album versions, they have been considered a compilation album and released under the title "The Best of 20 Fingers" in Asia.

Track listing

20 Fingers
 "Sex Machine"  – 4:03
 "Choke My Chicken"  – 3:34
 "Little Melody (That Damn Song)"  – 3:57
 "100% Woman"  – 4:09
 "Cave Man"  – 3:31
 "Holding on to Love"  – 3:59
 "Position #9"  – 4:32
 "Popsicle Love"  – 4:01
 "Electric Slide"  – 3:43
 "Bring It on Bac"  – 5:36
 "The Raw"  – 5:40

L'Album
See notes for further information.
 "Sex Machine"  – 4:03
 "Round We Go"  – 3:59
 "Electric Slide"  – 3:43
 "She Won't Know"  – 5:36
 "100% Woman"  – 4:09
 "Short Dick Man"  – 3:16
 "Holding on to Love"  – 3:59
 "Position #9"  – 4:32
 "Mr. Personality (Ugly Mix)"  – 4:04
 "Lick It"  – 3:34
 "Popsicle Love"  – 4:01
 "Putang Ina Mo" – 4:11
 "I'm in Love" 
 "Praying for an Angel"

20 Fingers compilation
See notes for further information.
 "Sex Machine"  – 4:03
 "Round We Go"  – 3:59
 "Cave Man"  – 3:31
 "Electric Slide"  – 3:43
 "Bring It on Bac"  – 5:36
 "Choke My Chicken"  – 3:34
 "100% Woman"  – 4:09
 "The Raw"  – 5:40
 "Short Dick Man"  – 3:16
 "Holding on to Love"  – 3:59
 "Position #9"  – 4:32
 "Mr. Personality (Ugly Mix)"  – 4:04
 "Lick It"  – 3:34
 "Take Your Time"  – 3:40
 "Work That Love"  – 3:32
 "Popsicle Love"  – 4:01
 "Fat Boy"  – 3:34
 "Putang Ina Mo" – 4:11
 "Little Melody (That Damn Song)"  – 3:57

Notes

References

1995 albums
20 Fingers albums
Zoo Entertainment (record label) albums